Saif Saeed Ghobash Al Marri (21 October 1932 – 25 October 1977) was an Emirati diplomat and engineer. He was the United Arab Emirates first Minister of State for Foreign Affairs.

Biography 

Born in Ras Al Khaimah, Ghobash studied at Al Ahmadiya School in Dubai before moving to Bahrain to finish his secondary education. He then studied engineering at Baghdad University and worked as an engineer in Kuwait and Europe. He came back to Ras Al Khaimah in 1969.

When the UAE was established in 1971, Ghobash started working as a diplomat and soon became undersecretary of the Ministry of Foreign Affairs. Two years later, he was named the first Minister of State for Foreign Affairs.

He is the father of Omar Saif Ghobash, the current UAE ambassador to France.

Death 
On 25 October 1977, Ghobash was shot and killed at Abu Dhabi International Airport by a Palestinian gunman who lived in Syria, apparently in Error. A New York Times article quotes Abdel Halim Khaddam, the intended target, as saying about the other gunmen that “they came from Baghdad”. Syria and Iraq were involved in constant tentions due to differences regarding the Baath Socialist Party 
.

Legacy 

A hospital in Ras Al Khaimah and a road in Abu Dhabi are named after Saif Ghobash.

The Saif Ghobash–Banipal Prize for Arabic Literary Translation, also known as The Banipal Prize, is an annual prize awarded to a translator (or translators) for the published English translation of a full-length literary work in the Arabic language. The prize was inaugurated in 2006 by the literary magazine Banipal which promotes the diffusion of contemporary Arabic literature through English translations and the Banipal Trust for Arab Literature. It is administered by the Society of Authors in the UK (which runs a number of similar literary translation prizes), and the prize money is sponsored by Omar Saif Ghobash and his family in memory of Ghobash's late father Saif Ghobash.

References

1932 births
1977 deaths
Assassinated Emirati politicians
Deaths by firearm in the United Arab Emirates
Government ministers of the United Arab Emirates
Emirati engineers
Emirati expatriates in Bahrain
Emirati expatriates in Iraq
Emirati expatriates in Kuwait
Emirati terrorism victims
People murdered in Abu Dhabi
Terrorism deaths in the United Arab Emirates
People from the Emirate of Ras Al Khaimah
University of Baghdad alumni
20th-century engineers